Sugar House Park, also known as Sugarhouse Park, is located between I-80, 2100 South, 1300 East, and 1700 East in  the Sugar House neighborhood of Salt Lake City, Utah, United States. The  park is at the heart of the Sugar House neighborhood.  It was the site of a fireworks show and concert every Independence Day (July 4), but the event was discontinued in 2018 due to environmental, logistical, and financial reasons. It is a popular sledding location in the winter.

The park was the location of Sugar House Prison, Utah's first state prison, until 1951 when the current prison was opened in Draper.

Features 

 10 pavilions for public use, available for reservation
 Popular sledding hills during the snowy months
  scenic pond with fountains
 2 Playgrounds
 Walking / jogging path estimated  around the entire perimeter of the park
 Estimated  road loop, great for cycling and jogging
 Baseball Field
 Basketball court
 Scattered picnic tables

References

External links

 

Parks in Salt Lake City